Mansour Faye is a Senegalese politician. In 2015, he became a vice-chair of the Global High-Level Panel on Water and Peace. He was re-elected mayor in the 2022 local elections.

He is also Minister of Infrastructure, Land Transport and Opening Up in the Fourth Sall government.

See also
 List of mayors of Saint-Louis, Senegal
 Timeline of Saint-Louis, Senegal

References

Living people
Year of birth missing (living people)
Place of birth missing (living people)
Mayors of places in Senegal
People from Saint-Louis, Senegal

Government ministers of Senegal
21st-century Senegalese politicians